The 2011 Philippine Basketball Association (PBA) Commissioner's Cup was the second conference of the 2010–11 PBA season. The tournament began on February 18 and ended on May 8, 2011. The tournament was an import-laden format, which requires an import or a pure-foreign player for each team and with a height limit of 6-foot-4. Defending 2002 champions Barako Bull Energy Boosters took a leave of absence during this conference. Replacing them was the Smart Gilas Philippine national team.

The Talk 'N Text Tropang Texters won their fourth and first back-to-back championship, defeating the Barangay Ginebra Kings, 4–2.

Format
The following format was observed for the duration of the conference:
 Single-round robin eliminations; 9 games per team; Teams are then seeded by basis on win–loss records. Ties are broken among points differences of the tied teams.
 The top two teams after the elimination round will automatically advance to the semifinals.
 The next four teams will play in a best of three quarterfinals series for the two last berths in the semifinals. Matchups are:
 QF1: #3 team vs. #6 team
 QF2: #4 team vs. #5 team
 The winners of the quarterfinals will challenge the top two teams in a best-of-five semifinals series. Matchups are:
 SF1: #1 vs. QF2
 SF2: #2 vs. QF1
The winners in the semifinals advance to the best of seven Finals.

Elimination round

Team standings

Schedule

Bracket

Quarterfinals

(3) Barangay Ginebra vs. (6) Rain or Shine

(4) Air21 vs. (5) Alaska

Semifinals

(1) Talk 'N Text vs. (4) Air21

(2) Smart Gilas vs. (3) Barangay Ginebra

Finals

Imports 
The following is the list of imports, which had played for their respective teams at least once, with the returning imports in italics. Highlighted are the imports who stayed with their respective teams for the whole conference.

Awards

Conference
Best Player of the Conference: Jimmy Alapag (Talk 'N Text)
Best Import of the Conference: Nate Brumfield (Barangay Ginebra)
Finals MVP: Jimmy Alapag and Jayson Castro (Talk 'N Text)

Players of the Week

Statistical leaders

Locals

Imports

References

External links
 PBA.ph

PBA Commissioner's Cup
Commissioner's Cup